Snowflake Midnight is the seventh studio album from Mercury Rev. It was released on September 29, 2008 in the UK, and September 30 in the US.

Made available on the same day from the band's website was a "companion" album, Strange Attractor. This eleven-track instrumental album was given away free as an MP3 download. The vinyl edition of "Snowflake Midnight" includes the "Strange Attractor" album as a bonus LP.

Track listing

Snowflake Midnight
All songs written by Jonathan Donahue, Sean "Grasshopper" Mackowiak and Jeff Mercel.
 "Snowflake in a Hot World" – 3:58
 "Butterfly's Wing" – 4:06
 "Senses on Fire" – 3:30
 "People are So Unpredictable (There's No Bliss Like Home)" – 6:40
 "October Sunshine" – 2:12
 "Runaway Raindrop" – 5:55
 "Dream of a Young Girl as a Flower" – 7:55
 "Faraway from Cars" – 3:19
 "A Squirrel and I (Holding On...and Then Letting Go)" – 3:54

Singles
 Senses on Fire / Butterfly's Wing (Remixes) (October 27, 2008)
 "Senses on Fire" (Fujiya & Miyagi Remix)
 "Senses on Fire" (James Holden Remix)
 "Butterfly's Wing" (ISAN Alien Adoption Remix)
 "Butterfly's Wing" (Carlos Anthony Molina "4 on the Flux" Mix)

Strange Attractor
 "Love Is Pure"
 "Taken Up into Clouds, Changed and Rained Down"
 "Pure Joie de la Solitude"
 "Persistence and the Apis Mellifera"
 "Fable of a Silver Moon"
 "Loop Lisse, Loop"
 "In My Heart, a Strange Attractor"
 "Incident on Abeel Street"
 "Af Den Fader Kommer Den Sol"
 "Because Because Because"
 "Nocturne for Norwood"

Personnel
 Jonathan Donahue
 Sean "Grasshopper" Mackowiak
 Dave Fridmann
 Jeff Mercel
 Carlos Anthony Molina

References

Mercury Rev albums
2008 albums
Albums free for download by copyright owner
Albums produced by Dave Fridmann